Vice Admiral Norman Atherton Wodehouse  (18 May 1887 – 4 July 1941) was a Royal Navy officer killed in the Second World War. He had gained 14 caps for England at rugby union, including six as captain between 1910 and 1913. Wodehouse was acting as a convoy commodore when his ship was sunk by a German U-boat.

Naval career 
Wodehouse joined the Royal Navy in 1902, serving as a midshipman in the Atlantic Fleet in 1904. During the First World War Wodehouse served in the battleship  at the Battle of Jutland as a gunnery officer. After the war he was appointed aide-de-camp to King George VI and appointed a Companion of the Order of the Bath. He commanded Royal Naval College, Dartmouth from 1931 to 1934.

Just before the outbreak of the Second World War Wodehouse became Rear Admiral, Gibraltar, a post he held until November 1939. He was placed on the Retired List in 1940 and in 1941 became a Convoy Commodore in the Royal Naval Reserve. U-69 sunk the Robert L. Holt in a gun duel. The U-boat fired 102 high explosive rounds and 34 incendiary rounds from the deck gun, 220 rounds from the 20mm gun and 400 rounds with the MG34. Robert L. Holt was sunk with the loss of all 56 crew including Wodehouse.

Family
He married Mrs Theodosia Frances Swire, née Boyle (1890–1966), daughter of Commander Edward Boyle and Theodosia Ogilvie, and widow of Captain Douglas William Swire (d. 1920), on 22 October 1923.

By his wife Theodosia, he had two sons:
 Rev. Armine Boyle Wodehouse (1924-2017), who has been twice married (once widowed), and has had issue, one son and two daughters.
 Charles Norman Boyle Wodehouse, (1927-2011), who has married, and has issue, one son and two daughters.

See also 

 List of England rugby union footballers killed in the World Wars

References

External links
   Commemoration of Rugby players who died in the two World Wars
 Royal Navy (RN) Officers 1939-1945
 Vice-Admiral Norman Atherton Wodehouse, genealogy
 Photographs of Wodehouse at the National Portrait Gallery

1887 births
1941 deaths
Royal Navy personnel killed in World War II
Companions of the Order of the Bath
England international rugby union players
English rugby union players
People from Basford, Nottinghamshire
Rugby union players from Nottinghamshire
Royal Navy admirals of World War II
Royal Navy officers of World War I
Royal Navy rugby union players
Norman Wodehouse
Military personnel from Nottinghamshire
Rugby union forwards